"Home" is a song by Canadian singer Michael Bublé, and released on January 24, 2005, as the second single from his second studio album, It's Time. The song was written by Bublé, along with co-writers Alan Chang and Amy Foster-Gillies.

Background and lyrics
"Home" centralizes on the male narrator, who is separated from his lover, possibly his wife, while off travelling. He expresses a desire to return home and be with his lover. Bublé had been away touring in Italy when he co-wrote the lyrics, for his then-fiancée, Debbie Timuss. Bublé describes his loneliness from missing her in the lyrics. Aaron Latham of Allmusic, in his review of It's Time, described the song favorably. He called it a "positive step forward" for Bublé, adding "The success of this ballad provides yet another direction that he can explore and expand upon."

Release
"Home" was the second single released from It's Time on March 28, 2005. It was Bublé's first single released in the United Kingdom. The single was a hit, topping the Billboard Adult Contemporary chart in the United States while peaking at number 31 in the United Kingdom. The release was accompanied by a music video, directed by Noble Jones, who had previously filmed the video for "Feeling Good". The song was also used in the film The Wedding Date.

Subsequently, two cover versions of the song have also been released as singles by other artists. The first of these was recorded by Irish boyband Westlife, whose version was a top ten hit in several European countries. American country music singer Blake Shelton also released his version in early 2008, which reached the top of the American country singles charts. In December 2011, Bublé performed a duet version of the song with English singer-songwriter Gary Barlow, whilst also performing Barlow's "Rule the World". The performance gained great reception from fans, when it began trending worldwide on Twitter. Soon after, a petition was set up for the collaboration to be made available for digital download, to challenge for the United Kingdom Christmas Number One spot. On Bublé's 2012 Christmas television special "Michael Bublé: Home for the Holidays", he and Blake Shelton sang a duet version with lyrics reworked for the Christmas season; this version previously appeared on Shelton's holiday album, Cheers, It's Christmas.

Track listing
UK CD single 1 (Debut release)
 "Home" (U.K. Radio Mix) - 3:23
 "Home" (Album Version) - 3:45

UK CD single 2 (Debut release)
 "Home" (UK radio mix) - 3:23
 "Home" (album version) - 3:45
 "Nice N'Easy" - 4:11
 "Home" (music video) - 3:54

UK CD single (Second release)
 "Home" (album version) - 3:45
 "Song For You" (featuring Chris Botti) - 3:12

Charts

Certifications

Release history

Westlife version

Irish boy band Westlife released a cover version of "Home" as their first single from their eighth studio album, Back Home (2007). Westlife's version differs slightly in their lyrical arrangement as compared to Michael Bublé's version. The single sold over 200,000 copies in the UK alone and was certified silver, peaking at number three on the UK Singles Chart. It is the band's 15th best-selling single in paid-for sales and in combined sales in the UK as of January 2019. The song was ranked number 91 on MTV Asias list of Top 100 Hits of 2007. A cover of Chicago's "Hard to Say I'm Sorry" was included as the B-side for the single and charted individually on the official UK Singles Chart at number 135.

Music video
The music video for this single was shot in Vancouver using interior and exterior shots of the Orpheum Theater.  The exterior shots of the marquee are on Granville Street. A short preview of the video was posted on the band's official website on October 5, 2007. The full video was made available during the later part of the day on The Box. It was directed by Mike Lipscombe and features the band in front of a Boeing 747 plane along with scenes of loved ones meeting each other at the airport.

Track listings
UK CD1
 "Home" (single mix)
 "Hard to Say I'm Sorry"

UK CD2
 "Home" (single mix)
 "Total Eclipse of the Heart" (Sunset Strippers Full Dance Mix)
 "Home" (Soul Seekerz Remix – radio edit)

Charts

Weekly charts

Year-end charts

Certifications

Blake Shelton version

A version was released by American country music singer Blake Shelton on February 1, 2008. This cover entered the Billboard Hot Country Songs chart at number 60 for the week of February 12, 2008. It was included on a June 2008 re-issue of Shelton's 2007 album Pure BS and Blake Shelton Collector's Edition, an EP which is only available at Walmart. Shelton's rendition features backing vocals from Miranda Lambert.

Shelton's version of the song reached Number One on the Billboard Hot Country Songs charts dated for the week of July 19, 2008, becoming the fourth Number One hit of his career, and his first since "Some Beach" in December 2004. His version also reached number 41 on the Billboard Hot 100.

Shelton occasionally performed the song with Bublé in concert. In 2012, he e-mailed Bublé, asking if he would write new lyrics for a Christmas version of the song and sing duet vocals on it. The re-written version, featuring Bublé, appears on Shelton's 2012 album, Cheers, It's Christmas.

Chart history

Weekly charts

AChristmas re-recording with Michael Bublé.
BLive recording with Usher.

Year-end charts

Certifications

Other notable recordings
 Having performed this song on-stage alongside Bublé at Wembley Arena (December 4, 2007), Leon Jackson, the winner of the fourth series of the UK rendition of The X Factor, released this song as a B-Side on his Christmas No. 1 single, "When You Believe".
 A cover of "Home" was sung by Damian McGinty in an episode on the third season of Glee, "Heart". It was also said that it is one of Damian's favorite songs.
 The song was included in Eoghan Quigg's critically vilified 2009 album.
 An R&B version of the song was included on Ruben Studdard's 2014 album Unconditional Love.
 An a cappella version by The King's Singers was published on their 2010 album Swimming Over London

See also
List of Billboard Adult Contemporary number ones of 2005

References

143 Records singles
2000s ballads
2005 singles
2005 songs
2007 singles
2008 singles
Blake Shelton songs
Juno Award for Single of the Year singles
Michael Bublé songs
Music videos directed by Mike Lipscombe
Pop ballads
RCA Records singles
Reprise Records singles
Song recordings produced by Brent Rowan
Song recordings produced by Steve Mac
Songs about loneliness
Songs written by Alan Chang
Songs written by Amy S. Foster
Songs written by Michael Bublé
Sony BMG singles
Sony Music singles
Soul ballads
Warner Records Nashville singles
Westlife songs